(1053–1140), also known as  for his priesthood, was a Japanese artist-monk, and the son of Minamoto no Takakuni.

Kakuyū was a high priest of Tendai Buddhism.
In 1138, he became the 48th  (the chief of the Tendai school).

Kakuyū was also an artist proficient in both Buddhism art and satirical cartoon and his work (confirmed to be authentic) includes Fudōmyō'ō-ritsuzō at Daigo-ji, an Important Cultural Property of Japan.
Perhaps the most famous one is the picture scroll Chōjū-giga, a National Treasure of Japan and one of the earliest manga—however, this attribution has no proof and may be spurious.

His works are held in the permanent collections of the Metropolitan Museum of Art and the University of Michigan Museum of Art.

References 
Kōjien, 6th edition.

1053 births
1140 deaths
Japanese religious leaders
Japanese cartoonists
Japanese Buddhist clergy
Tendai
Japanese Buddhists
12th-century Buddhists
12th-century Buddhist monks
12th-century Japanese painters
Buddhist monks